The METRORapid Silver Line is a bus rapid transit line in Houston, Texas operated by METRO. Opened August 23, 2020, the line connects the Uptown area of Houston, with dedicated lanes over nearly the entire length of the corridor. It serves the Northwest Transit Center, 8 stations along Post Oak Boulevard in Uptown, and the Westpark/Lower Uptown Transit Center. On internal METRO documents, the METRORapid Silver Line is designated as Route 433.

The line was originally planned as a  extension of the METRORail light rail network under the name Uptown/Gold Line. Due to lack of funds, it was announced in early 2013 that the line would be constructed initially as a bus rapid transit line using three-door buses. The design features the ability to convert the line to light rail in the future.

The Silver Line is the first segment of a planned 75 mile network of bus rapid transit service in Houston, branded as METRORapid.

Route 
The Silver Line runs between Westpark/Lower Uptown Transit Center, a park and ride facility located on Westpark Drive near the Located at the Southwest Freeway (I-69/US 59) & West Loop (I-610), and Northwest Transit Center, located at Katy Road on the north side of the I-10 interchange. This corridor was previously served by Route 33.  Silver Line buses serve eight stations via bus-only lanes in the median of Post Oak Boulevard through the Uptown area. These lanes connect to the Northwest Transit Center with an elevated two-lane busway along the West Loop portion of Interstate 610.

History 
Following a statement in 2010 by Houston's mayor, Annise Parker, construction would commence at a time when funding can be secured for this line. Furthermore, due to the lack of infrastructure upgrades promised by the Uptown Management District, METRO would hold off on anything related to the line until a deal was arranged.

The light rail project was repeatedly blocked by Congressman John Culberson, based on concerns from constituents on Richmond Avenue. It was downgraded to a $177.5 million bus rapid transit project with dedicated lanes in 2013, under a plan promoted by Uptown developers to receive improved transit service sooner than the estimated 2025 arrival of light rail.

Construction began in 2016 with the line's opening planned for 2018. However, the project faced several delays before service began in 2020.

Stations 

Listed from north to south:

Expansion 

An  extension north to Northwest Mall—a future Texas Central Railway station)—and a western extension to the Hillcroft Transit Center have been proposed.

References

External links 
METRO Official Website
Go METRORail

METRORail
Proposed railway lines in Texas
Bus rapid transit in Texas
2020 in Texas
Transport infrastructure completed in 2020